Mitek Systems, Inc is a software company that specializes in digital identity verification and mobile image processing using artificial intelligence. The company's software is used for depositing checks and opening bank accounts via mobile devices. It also verifies identity documents such as passports, ID cards, and driver's licenses by analyzing a selfie of an individual holding their ID, comparing their face to the photo on the document.

History 
The company was founded in 1986 and is headquartered in San Diego, California.

In 2011, it was announced that Mitek intended to expand into mobile imaging software for the health care and insurance industries, in addition to mobile banking.

In 2014, USAA and Mitek Systems, Inc. settled a -year-old dispute over the invention of the technology used for mobile check deposits, with both companies' patents remaining intact and neither side paying the other.

On May 26, 2015, the company acquired IDchecker, a provider of cloud-based identity document verification and facial recognition products.

On October 16, 2017, the company acquired Icar Vision Systems, a Spanish company specializing in customer identity verification.

References 

Companies based in San Diego
Financial technology companies
American companies established in 1986
Identity management systems
Software companies of the United States